Komorn may refer to:

 Komárom in Hungary, Komorn in German
 Komárno in Slovakia, Komorn in German